Rush Creek is a stream in Clay County in the U.S. state of Missouri. It is a tributary of the Missouri River.

According to the State Historical Society of Missouri, Lewis and Clark may have described Rush Creek on their expedition.

See also
List of rivers of Missouri

References

Rivers of Clay County, Missouri
Rivers of Missouri